Charles Quincy Tirrell (December 10, 1844 – July 31, 1910) was a lawyer, educator, and U.S. Representative from Massachusetts.

Biography
Born in Sharon, Massachusetts, Tirrell attended public schools and later studied law at Dartmouth College, graduating in 1866. He served as principal of Peacham Academy in Peacham, Vermont, for one year, and of St. Johnsbury High School for two years. He was admitted to the bar in 1870 and commenced practice in Boston, Massachusetts. He served as a member of the Massachusetts House of Representatives in 1872. He moved to Natick, Massachusetts, in 1873. He served in the Massachusetts Senate in 1881 and 1882.

Tirrell was elected as a Republican to the Fifty-seventh and to the four succeeding Congresses, serving from March 4, 1901, until his death in Natick on July 31, 1910. He was interred in Dell Park Cemetery.

See also
 1872 Massachusetts legislature
 1881 Massachusetts legislature
 List of United States Congress members who died in office (1900–49)

References

Bibliography
Who's who in State Politics, 1908 Practical Politics  (1908) p. 21.

Charles Q. Tirrell, late a representative from Massachusetts, Memorial addresses delivered in the House of Representatives and Senate frontispiece 1911

1844 births
1910 deaths
Dartmouth College alumni
Republican Party members of the Massachusetts House of Representatives
Republican Party Massachusetts state senators
People from Sharon, Massachusetts
Republican Party members of the United States House of Representatives from Massachusetts
19th-century American politicians